Ken or Kenneth Griffin may refer to:

Kenneth W. Griffin (1909–1956), American organist
Kenneth C. Griffin (born 1968), American hedge fund manager and billionaire
Ken Griffin (1914-1988), American leatherworker and magician